John Thomas Mhina Sepeku (1908November 1983) was the inaugural archbishop and primate of the Anglican Church of Tanzania, serving from 5 July 1970 until his resignation (in ill-health) effective 1 September 1978.

Sepeku was educated at Hegono Theological College. He was ordained deacon in 1938 and priest in 1939. He worked in the Diocese of Central Tanganyika from 1938 to 1960. He was Archdeacon of Magila from 1960 to 1963. He was consecrated an bishop on 24 March 1963, serving as an assistant bishop of Zanzibar and Dar es Salaam — he lived in Dar es Salaam — until that diocese was split. He was installed as the first diocesan Bishop of Dar es Salaam on the diocese's inauguration (10 July 1965) and remained bishop of that diocese (even while also Archbishop & Primate) until his death in 1983.

References

1908 births
1983 deaths
20th-century Anglican bishops in Tanzania
20th-century Anglican archbishops
Archdeacons of Magila
Anglican archbishops of Tanzania
Anglican bishops of Dar es Salaam